Lomatia ilicifolia, commonly known as holly lomatia or native holly, is a plant in the family Proteaceae and is endemic to south-eastern Australia. It is a stiff, erect shrub with hairy, rust-coloured new growth and which recovers from fire from a lignotuber. It has dull green, leathery, prickly, holly-like leaves and long sprays of cream flowers, usually after fire.

Description
The leaves are dull green, leathery and holly-like, mostly glabrous and egg-shaped to lance-shaped or elliptic.

Hybrids with L. myricoides, L. silaifolia and L. fraseri occasionally occur where these species grow near L. ilicifolia.

Taxonomy and naming
Lomatia ilicifolia was first formally described in 1810 by Robert Brown from a specimen collected near Port Phillip. The description was published in Transactions of the Linnean Society of London.

The specific epithet (ilicifolia) is derived from the Latin words ilex, ilicis meaning "holm-oak, a genus of the holly family" and folium meaning "leaf".

Distribution and habitat
Native holly is widespread and locally common in south-eastern  Victoria where it grows in heath or woodland, sometimes in montane forests, from the Otway Ranges eastward to Gippsland. In New South Wales it grows in sclerophyll forest on the coast and nearby ranges south of Moss Vale.

Ecology
Native holly attracts nectar-feeding butterflies.

Use in horticulture
This lomatia is a hardy, slow-growing plant with interesting foliage, well-displayed flowers and attractive fruit. It is frost-tolerant and grows in full sun or partial shade.

References

Flora of New South Wales
Flora of Victoria (Australia)
Plants described in 1810
ilicifolia
Proteales of Australia